
George Clinton commonly refers to:

George Clinton (funk musician) (born 1941), American funk musician
George Clinton (vice president) (1739–1812), 4th Vice President of the United States and 1st Governor of New York

George Clinton may also refer to:

Music
George Clinton (clarinettist) (1850–1913), British clarinettist
George S. Clinton (born 1947), American musician

Politics
George Clinton (Royal Navy officer) (1686–1761), British colonial governor of Newfoundland and of New York
George Clinton Jr. (1771–1809), U.S. Representative from New York, nephew of Vice President George Clinton
George W. Clinton (1807–1885), mayor of Buffalo, New York
George De Witt Clinton, member of the 77th (1854) and 80th New York State Legislatures (1857)
George Clinton (born 1846), member of the 107th New York State Legislature (1884), son of Mayor George W. Clinton
George Henry Clinton, Louisiana politician

Other people
George Perkins Clinton (1867–1937), American botanist and mycologist
George Clinton (rugby league) (1924–2010), English rugby league footballer who played in the 1940s and 1950s, and coached in the 1950s and 1960s

See also
Clinton (surname)
George Clinton Sweeney (1895–1966), United States federal judge